Mandy Minella was the defending champion, but lost to Alexandra Cadanțu in the semifinals.

Aleksandra Krunić won the title, after Cadanțu retired at 3–6, 0–3.

Seeds

Draw

Finals

Top half

Bottom half

Qualifying

Seeds

Qualifiers

Qualifying draw

First qualifier

Second qualifier

Third qualifier

Fourth qualifier

External Links
 Main Draw
 Qualifying Draw

Bol Open - Doubles
Croatian Bol Ladies Open